Oumar Gonzalez (born 25 February 1998) is a Cameroonian professional footballer who plays as a defender for  club Ajaccio.

Club career
On 10 August 2015, Gonzalez signed his first professional contract with Metz. After several seasons out on loan at different clubs, he signed with Chambly on 7 June 2019. Gonzalez made his professional debut with the club in a 1–0 Ligue 2 win over Valenciennes on 26 July 2019.

International career
Gonzalez represented the Cameroon U23s at the 2019 Africa U-23 Cup of Nations.

References

External links
 
 
 

1998 births
Living people
Footballers from Douala
Cameroonian footballers
Association football fullbacks
Cameroon youth international footballers
Ligue 1 players
Ligue 2 players
Championnat National players
Championnat National 3 players
FC Metz players
SAS Épinal players
Rodez AF players
FC Villefranche Beaujolais players
FC Chambly Oise players
AC Ajaccio players
Cameroonian emigrants to France